Jalan FELDA Kemahang, Federal Route 1739, is a federal road in Kelantan, Malaysia.

At most sections, the Federal Route 1739 was built under the JKR R5 road standard, with a speed limit of 90 km/h.

List of junctions and towns 

Malaysian Federal Roads
Roads in Kelantan